Henry Lansdell (10January 18414October 1919) was a nineteenth-century British priest in the Church of England. He was also a noted explorer and author.

Life 
Born in Tenterden, Kent, Lansdell was the son of a schoolmaster and home schooled before attending St John's College in Highbury, north London. He then studied at the London College of Divinity before his ordination as a deacon in 1868 and his assignment as a curate in Greenwich. He subsequently became secretary to the Irish Church Missions (1869–79) and founder and honorary secretary of the Homiletical Society (1874–86). He established the Clergyman's Magazine in 1875, which he edited until 1883.

After spending holidays in Europe, Lansdell began long and often arduous journeys to little-known parts of Asia. He distributed multi-lingual religious tracts and bibles provided by London missionary societies wherever he went, most notably in prisons and hospitals in Siberia and central Asia. Such activities sometimes aroused the suspicions of the Russian authorities and on one occasion he was arrested while travelling on the Perm Railway after it was thought he was distributing revolutionary pamphlets. 

Lansdell's accounts of his travels across the Central Asian Steppe published in 1887 by Harper's Magazine describe in detail the Turko-Tartar, Caucasian and ethnic diversity of the region, as well as the geographic, topographic and climate diversity.   

Lansdell's journey from Hotan to Yarkand in present-day Xinjiang "across deserts abominable" was probably the first by any Englishman.

He was the author of a number of books including Chinese Central Asia: A Ride to Little Tibet, which ran to five editions in English and was also translated into German, Danish, and Swedish. The two volumes recorded part of Lansdell's  journey through Europe and Africa to Asia. Lansdell's objective was to deliver a letter from the Archbishop of Canterbury to the Dalai Lama, which he hoped would grant him access to the then closed capital of Tibet at Lhasa. In the end he was unable to obtain the requisite permission and had to make do with purchasing items from a trader who had been to Tibet.

Lansdell was a member of the Royal Asiatic Society, the Royal Geographical Society (elected 1876), and a life member of the British Association for the Advancement of Science on whose committee he served.

He died on 4 October 1919 at home in Blackheath, London, and is buried in St Mary’s Church, Greenwich at his own request.

Legacy 
In 1922, Lansdell's wife Mary bequeathed a large collection of items he had collected on his travels to Canterbury Museum (now Canterbury Heritage Museum) as "a memorial to my late husband".

Works 
 (2 volumes)
 (2 volumes)

 (2 volumes)

References

External links 

 
Items donated by Lansdell to Canterbury Museum

1841 births
1919 deaths
People from Tenterden
Alumni of St John's College, Nottingham
19th-century English Anglican priests
English explorers
Explorers of Central Asia
Fellows of the Royal Asiatic Society
Fellows of the Royal Geographical Society
English travel writers
English Anglican missionaries
English male non-fiction writers
Anglican missionaries in China